Nuoxi may refer to:

Nuoxi language, a Kam–Sui language of Nuoxi township, Dongkou County, Hunan Province, China
Nuo opera (nuoxi), popular folk opera in southern China